Haroutune Krikor Daghlian Jr. (May 4, 1921 – September 15, 1945) was an American physicist with the Manhattan Project, which designed and produced the atomic bombs that were used in World War II. He accidentally irradiated himself on August 21, 1945, during a critical mass experiment at the remote Omega Site of the Los Alamos Laboratory in New Mexico and died 25 days later from the resultant radiation poisoning.

Daghlian was irradiated as a result of a criticality accident that occurred when he accidentally dropped a tungsten carbide brick onto a 6.2 kg plutonium–gallium alloy bomb core. This core, subsequently nicknamed the "demon core", was later involved in the death of another physicist, Louis Slotin.

Early life
Haroutune Krikor Daghlian Jr., of Armenian-American descent, was born in Waterbury, Connecticut, on May 4, 1921, one of three children of Margaret Rose (née Currie) and Haroutune Krikor Daghlian. He had a sister, Helen, and a brother, Edward. Soon after his birth the family moved across state to the coastal town of New London, Connecticut. He was educated at Harbor Elementary School, where he played violin in the school orchestra, and at Bulkeley High School. In 1938, at the age of 17, he entered the Massachusetts Institute of Technology, intending to study mathematics, but became interested in physics, particularly particle physics, which was then emerging as an exciting new field. This interest led him to transfer to the West Lafayette, Indiana, campus of Purdue University, from which he graduated with a Bachelor of Science degree in 1942. He then commenced work on his doctorate, assisting Marshall Holloway with the cyclotrons. In 1944, while still a graduate student, he joined Otto Frisch's Critical Assembly Group at the Los Alamos Laboratory of the Manhattan Project.

Criticality accident and death

During an experiment on August 21, 1945, Daghlian was attempting to build a neutron reflector manually by stacking a set of  tungsten carbide bricks in an incremental fashion around a plutonium core. The purpose of the neutron reflector was to reduce the mass required for the plutonium core to attain criticality. He was moving the final brick over the assembly, but neutron counters alerted Daghlian to the fact that the addition of that brick would render the system supercritical. As he withdrew his hand, he inadvertently dropped the brick onto the center of the assembly. Since the assembly was nearly in the critical state, the accidental addition of that brick caused the reaction to go immediately into the prompt critical region of neutronic behavior. This resulted in a criticality accident.

Daghlian reacted immediately after dropping the brick and attempted to knock the brick off the assembly without success. He was forced to disassemble part of the tungsten-carbide pile in order to halt the reaction.

Daghlian was estimated to have received a dose of 510 rem (5.1 Sv) of neutron radiation, from a yield of 1016 fissions. Despite intensive medical care, he developed symptoms of severe radiation poisoning, and his sister and widowed mother were flown out to care for him. He fell into a coma and died 25 days after the accident. He was the first known fatality caused by a criticality accident. His body was returned to New London, where he was buried at Cedar Grove Cemetery.

Legacy
As a result of the incident, safety regulations for the project were scrutinized and revised. A special committee was established to review any similar experiments and recommend appropriate safety procedures. This change of procedures included needing a minimum of two people involved in such an experiment, using at least two instruments monitoring neutron intensities with audible alerts, and preparing a plan for operating methods and any contingencies that might occur during similar experiments. Additionally, discussions and designs for remote-controlled test devices were initiated, eventually leading to the creation of the Godiva device.

These changes did not prevent another criticality accident from happening at Los Alamos the following year. Louis Slotin, a colleague of Daghlian's, was killed in 1946 while performing criticality tests on the same plutonium core. After these two incidents it became known as the "demon core", and all similar criticality experiments were halted until remote-controlled assembly devices were more fully developed and available.

In 2000, the city of New London erected a memorial stone and flagpole in Calkins Park to honor Daghlian. The monument bears an inscription: "though not in uniform, he died in service to his country."

References

External links

 

1921 births
1945 deaths
Accidental deaths in New Mexico
American nuclear physicists
American people of Armenian descent
Armenian physicists
Deaths from laboratory accidents
Manhattan Project people
People from Los Alamos, New Mexico
People from Waterbury, Connecticut
People from New London, Connecticut
Plutonium
Purdue University alumni
Victims of radiological poisoning
Burials at Cedar Grove Cemetery (New London, Connecticut)